Çorum Clock Tower is a clock tower in the Central district of Çorum province, Turkey. It was built either in 1894 according to Çorum Provincial Culture and Tourism Directorate and Meltem Cansever, or in 1896 according to Hakkı Acun.

References 

Buildings and structures in Çorum Province
Clock towers in Turkey
Towers completed in 1896
19th-century architecture in Turkey